South Ice was a British support base  from the South Pole at 81°57'S, 29°00'W in Edith Ronne Land, Antarctica during the International Geophysical Year, established by Commonwealth Trans-Antarctic Expedition, where three men overwintered during the Antarctic winter of 1957. In the same winter, men overwintered for the first time at the South Pole.

The name of the station contrasts to North Ice which was a British research station in Greenland.

See also
 List of Antarctic research stations
 List of Antarctic field camps
 Crime in Antarctica

References

 Trans-Antarctic Expedition, 1957-1958

External links
 Trans-Antarctic Expedition, 1955-1958

Outposts of Antarctica
Outposts of Queen Elizabeth Land
1957 establishments in Antarctica
1958 disestablishments in Antarctica